David John Szymakowski (born March 15, 1946) is a former American football wide receiver in the National Football League (NFL) who played for the New Orleans Saints. He played college football at West Texas A&M University.

References 

1946 births
Living people
American football wide receivers
West Texas A&M Buffaloes football players
New Orleans Saints players
Southern California Sun players
Sportspeople from Bethlehem, Pennsylvania
Players of American football from Pennsylvania